General elections were held in Siam on 12 November 1938 to elect 91 members of the 182-seat House of Representatives. The other 91 members had been appointed by the King after the 1937 elections. At the time there were no political parties, so all candidates ran as independents. Voter turnout was 35%.

Results

References

Siam
General
Elections in Thailand
Non-partisan elections
Election and referendum articles with incomplete results